The 2021–22 Ohio University Bobcats men's basketball team represented Ohio University for the 2021–22 NCAA Division I men's basketball season. The Bobcats were led by third-year head coach Jeff Boals, who was a 1995 graduate of Ohio University. The team played their home games at the Convocation Center in Athens, Ohio as a member of the Mid-American Conference.

Ohio completed non-conference play with a record of 9–2 with wins over OVC favorite Belmont, Horizon favorite Cleveland St., and rival Marshall with losses only to Kentucky and LSU. Ohio opened conference play 5–0 to extend their winning streak to nine games. Ohio lost to Toledo in the next game and fell into second place in the MAC standings. After a win against Western Michigan, Ohio regained first place with a conference record of 10–1.  With an overall record of 19–3 they stood alone in Ohio basketball history for the best record after 22 games. Their five-game winning streak was snapped in the following game with a second loss to Toledo which left both teams with two losses in MAC conference play.  After three consectutive wins following the Toledo loss, the Bobcats then lost 4 out of their last 5 conference games and finished the regular season 23–8 and 14–6 in conference play which was tied for third place in the MAC. During the lone win the that 5 game stretch, starting power forward Ben Vander Plas scored the fourth triple double in program history in a win against Central Michigan. After the regular season Vander Plas was named the Division I Academic All-American of the Year

After defeating Ball State in the quarterfinals, the Bobcats lost to Kent State in the semi-finals of the MAC tournament. Ohio was the #3 seed in the CBI. They defeated Rice in the first round before losing to Abilene Christian in the second round.

Previous season

In a season limited due to the ongoing COVID-19 pandemic, the Bobcats finished the 2020–21 season 17–8, 9–5 in MAC play to finish in fourth place. As the No. 5 seed in the MAC tournament, they defeated Kent State, Toledo, and Buffalo to win the tournament championship. As a result, they received the conference's automatic bid to the NCAA tournament as the No. 13 seed in the West region. There they upset No. 4-seeded ACC champion Virginia in the First Round before losing to No. 5-seeded Creighton in the Second Round.

Offseason
During the offseason point guard Jason Preston declared for the NBA draft while 2021 starting forward Dwight Wilson III suffered a season ending injury.

2022 NBA Draft

Departures

Incoming transfers

 Walk-on in 2021-22

Recruiting class

Preseason
Prior to the season Ohio was picked second in the MAC preseason poll.  Ben Vander Plas was named to the preseason first team all-conference while Jason Carter was on the second team.

Preseason rankings

MAC Tournament Champions: Buffalo (8), Bowling Green (1), Kent State (1), Miami (1), Toledo (1)

Source

Preseason All-MAC 

Source

Roster

Support Staff 

Source:

Schedule and results

|-
!colspan=9 style=|Exhibition

|-
!colspan=9 style=|Non-conference regular season

 

|-
!colspan=12 style=| MAC regular season

|-
!colspan=9 style=| MAC Tournament

|-
!colspan=9 style=| College Basketball Invitational

Source

Statistics

Team Statistics
Through November 7, 2022

Source

Player statistics

Source

Team and individual highs

Team Game Highs

Individual Game Highs

Source

Awards and honors

Weekly Awards

Midseason awards watchlists

All-MAC Awards 

Source

National Awards

Rankings

*AP does not release post-NCAA Tournament rankings.^Coaches do not release a Week 1 poll.

Source

References

Ohio Bobcats men's basketball seasons
Ohio
Ohio
Ohio Bobcats men's basketball
Ohio Bobcats men's basketball